Erik Lindvall (8 March 1895 – 5 June 1973) was a Swedish sprinter. He competed in the men's 100 metres at the 1920 Summer Olympics.

References

1895 births
1973 deaths
Athletes (track and field) at the 1920 Summer Olympics
Swedish male sprinters
Olympic athletes of Sweden
Place of birth missing